Cryptomatte is open-source software created by Jonah Friedman and Andy Jones at Psyop, but is also used synonymously for the specific style of image created by the software or other software working alike.

Owing to its ubiquity, integration into popular 3D graphic software and rather easy usability, Cryptomatte became a quasi standard in the industry.

Render processing 
The program itself creates an ID matte of a scene that can be used to create for example image masks for single or multiple objects in the scene. The ID matte has a very distinctive look and itself is sometimes referred to as cryptomatte. These cryptomatte images are in general very colourful assigning each object or material a different random colour. The program creates mattes that support motion blur, transparency and depth of field using data that is already available at render time.

Supported render engines 
Cryptomatte images can be created by various 3D graphic programs like Blender, Autodesk Maya, Autodesk 3ds Max or Houdini and are usually exported using the OpenEXR file format.

Whether a program is able to generate a cryptomatte or not is determined by the used render engine. If a program supports more than one render engine it is possible that it can generate cryptomatte images with one engine while being unable to do so with the other one. Blender, for example, had no option to create a cryptomatte image before version 2.80. With version 2.80 only the path-tracing render engine „Cycles” supported creating a cryptomatte while the newly added real-time render engine „Eevee” did not. The support to create cryptomatte images was added to Eevee with version 2.92 that was published on February 25, 2021 one and a half years after Eevee was first published.

The following render engines are known to support creating cryptomatte images:

Supported compositing software

Workflow example 
In a 3D scene a cryptomatte image can be created that assigns a unique ID to each object. The objects usually also have distinct colours that make a scene with many objects very colourful. The ID matte can be used to pick one or more objects in a scene. The ID matte can either be exported or it can be used by the 3D software itself for compositing.

An example workflow would be to use the cryptomatte image to generate a mask that itself is used to limit an effect to only a certain part of the image. It can thereby be used to quickly create masks without the need of re-rendering a whole scene.

The example workflow for images:

The same workflow for video files:

The masks in the examples can be used to limit a visual effect so that only the cube in the middle is affected.

Licensing 
The developers published the program's source code and licensed it under the BSD 3-clause license "to turn it into an ecosystem around an open standard". Their goal was "to see a diverse ecosystem of renderers that can create Cryptomatte images and plugins for compositing applications to decode them".

See also 
 Deep image compositing

External links 

 Cryptomatte on github.com
 Fully automatic ID mattes with support for motion blur and transparency (pdf file from SIGGRAPH 2015)

References 

Free and open-source software
Software using the BSD license
2016 software
Cross-platform free software
Free software programmed in Lua (programming language)
Free software programmed in Python